Libotonius is an extinct genus of prehistoric percopsiform in the monotypic family Libotoniidae which lived during the middle division of the Eocene epoch.  The type species Libotonius blakeburnensis is named for Blakeburn, British Columbia, the type locality of the genus and species in the Allenby Formation.  The second species, Libotonius pearsoni is known exclusively from the Klondike Mountain Formation in Republic, Washington.

References

Prehistoric perciform genera
Eocene fish
Fossils of British Columbia